"Blue Light Boogie" is a song written by Jessie Mae Robinson and Louis Jordan. It was performed by Louis Jordan and his Tympany Five, recorded in June 1950, and released on the Decca label (catalog no. 27114). On the original 78 record, the song was divided into two parts with part 1 on the "A" side and part 2 on the "B" side.

The song peaked at No. 4 on Billboards R&B chart.  It was ranked No. 8 on Billboard's year-end list of the top-selling R&B records of 1950 and No. 9 based on juke box plays.

See also
 Billboard Top R&B Records of 1950

References

Louis Jordan songs
1950 songs
Songs written by Louis Jordan
Songs written by Jessie Mae Robinson